Pristimantis rozei is a species of frog in the family Strabomantidae.
It is endemic to Venezuela.
Its natural habitat is tropical moist montane forests.

References

rozei
Endemic fauna of Venezuela
Amphibians of Venezuela
Amphibians described in 1961
Taxonomy articles created by Polbot